The 1985–86 Toronto Maple Leafs season was the 69th season of the franchise and its 59th season as the Maple Leafs. Despite posting the fourth-worst record in the league, the Leafs qualified for the last playoff spot in a very weak Norris Division; the division champion Chicago Black Hawks only recorded 86 points. The Leafs' .356 winning percentage is the fourth-worst in franchise history, and one of the worst ever for a playoff qualifier.

Despite this, the Leafs swept the Hawks in three games in the Norris Semi-finals before being eliminated by the St. Louis Blues in a seven-game Norris Final.

Offseason

NHL Draft

Regular season

Final standings

Schedule and results

Player statistics

Regular season
Scoring

Goaltending

Playoffs
Scoring

Goaltending

Playoffs

Norris Division Semi-Finals
Toronto Maple Leafs vs. Chicago Black Hawks

Toronto wins best-of-five series 3–0

Norris Division Finals
Toronto Maple Leafs vs. St. Louis Blues

St. Louis wins best-of-seven series 4–3

Transactions
The Maple Leafs have been involved in the following transactions during the 1985–86 season.

Trades

Free agents

Awards and records
 Wendel Clark, NHL All-Rookie Team
 Wendel Clark, Runner-up for the Calder Trophy
 Ken Wregget, Molson Cup (Most game star selections for Toronto Maple Leafs)

Farm Teams
The Maple Leafs were affiliated with the St. Catharines Saints of the AHL.

References
 Maple Leafs on Hockey Database

Toronto Maple Leafs seasons
Toronto Maple Leafs season, 1985-86
Toronto